Fake may refer to:
 Deception, an act or a statement intended to deceive
 Charlatan, a person who practices deception to obtain money or other advantages
 Counterfeit, a reproduction of an item, intended to deceive
 Cover-up, an attempt to conceal wrongdoing, error, or other embarrassing information
 Decoy, a person, device, or event meant as a distraction
 Fake news, a form of news consisting of deliberate disinformation or hoaxes spread via traditional news media or online social media.
 False (disambiguation)
 Falsity, the deceitfulness of one party culminating in damage to another party
 Feint, a maneuver designed to distract or mislead, often in fencing or military tactics
 Forgery, the falsification of a legal instrument with the intent to defraud
 Fraud, or sham, an intentional deception made for personal gain or to damage another individual
 Hoax, a falsehood deliberately crafted to deceive
 Illusion, a distortion of the senses, which can reveal how the human brain normally organizes and interprets sensory stimulation.
 Replica, a reproduction of an item, not necessarily intended to deceive

Arts, entertainment, and media

Films
 The Fake (1927 film), a silent British drama film
 The Fake (1953 film), a British film
 Fake (2003 film), a Thai movie
 Fake (2010 film), a film featuring Fisher Stevens
 The Fake (2013 film), a South Korean animated film

Music

Groups
 Fake (Swedish band), a band active in the 1980s
 Fake, an American electro band remixed by Imperative Reaction
 Fake?, a Japanese rock band

Recordings
 Fake (album), by Adorable
 "Fake" (Ai song) (2010)
 "Fake" (Alexander O'Neal song) (1987)
 "Fake" (Simply Red song) (2003)
 "Fake", a song by Brand New Heavies from Brother Sister
 "Fake", a song by Brockhampton from Saturation
 "Fake", a 1994 song by Korn from Korn
 "Fake", a song by Mötley Crüe
 ""Fake", a song by Five Finger Death Punch off their album And Justice for None
 ""Fake it", a song by Seether off their album Finding Beauty in Negative Spaces

Other uses in arts, entertainment, and media
 Fake (manga), a BL manga
 Fake, a 1969 book by Clifford Irving about art forger Elmyr de Hory
 Fake book, a collection of musical lead sheets
 The Fake (play), a 1924 work by the British writer Frederick Lonsdale

People
 Caterina Fake
 Chen Fake

Places
 Fake, Nigeria, a village 90 miles from Katagum

See also

 Faker (disambiguation)
 Faking (disambiguation)